The Red Line will be the first section of a light rail system in the Tel Aviv metropolitan area, known as the Tel Aviv Light Rail. The line will run from Bat Yam in the south to Petah Tikva in the northeast with a significant portion of it underground. The total cost of the red line is estimated at NIS 11 billion or, approximately US$3 billion. Construction began in 2011 and is expected to be completed in May 2023, after numerous delays.

Route
The Red Line will have a total of 34 stations. It will start at Petah Tikva's Central Bus Station, east of Tel Aviv and follow Jabotinsky Road (Route 481) westwards at street level. The underground section will include 10 stations, including an interchange with Israel Railways services at Tel Aviv Central Railway Station and the nearby 2000 Terminal. A maintenance depot, connected via a branch line and tunnel to the main section of the line, will be constructed in Kiryat Aryeh, across from the existing Kiryat Arye suburban railway station. The branch line will include two passenger stations, at Em HaMoshavot Road and an interchange station at the Kiryat Arye railway station.

A planned southern extension will add  into the city of Rishon LeZion and three intermediate stops and an inter-modal terminus which will serve as connection with Israel Railways' Rishon LeZion Moshe Dayan Railway Station and the projected Green Line.

Operator
The concession to build and operate the Red Line was awarded in December 2006 to the Metropolitan Transportation Solution (MTS) Consortium, which consisted of Africa Israel Investments, China Civil Engineering Construction Corporation (CCECC), Soares da Costa (Portugal), the Egged Bus Cooperative, Siemens, and the Dutch transportation company HTM.

The concession was a Build Operate Transfer (BOT) contract worth NIS 7.1 billion, the biggest private sector contract ever tendered in Israel's history. MTS' bid was just NIS 400 million under that of rival Metrorail, who bid NIS 7.5 billion.

Financing difficulties
The BOT agreement with the MTS consortium was signed in February 2007 and construction was to start a year later, in February 2008. However, the consortium was unable to secure the necessary financing and was given several extensions to the agreed timetable. The difficulties raising the funding was attributed to the global financial crisis and specifically to the financial problems at Africa Israel Investments Group.
In November 2009, the Israeli government announced that it was considering canceling the agreement with the consortium and granted another extension until March 2010. It was announced that if funding is not secured by then, the government will consider other options for financing the railway, including the option of using public instead of private funding for the project. The deadline was then extended again to summer 2010 and in August the government, after extensive negotiations with MTS failed, finally canceled the MTS concession, though MTS indicated it would appeal the government's decision in arbitration proceeding.

NTA takes over
Following the cancellation of the MTS contract, the government announced that it would fund the construction directly from the Treasury and that NTA would manage subsequent phases of construction. As a result, NTA published a tender for the design of multiple launching shafts for the TBMs that would dig the 11 km of tunnels for the railway. In March 2011, the shafts' construction tender was published as well, in addition to a tender for the design of the Kiryat Aryeh depot. The anticipated overall completion date of the railway was 31 December 2017. On December 20, 2010, the transfer of the entire project's management to NTA was approved by the project's arbitrators with MTS. On January 12, 2012, NTA published a pre-qualify (PQ) bid for the design-build contract for excavating the Red and Green lines' tunnels to be performed by several TBMs operating simultaneously.

Construction
The line is currently scheduled for completion in February 2023. Initial preparatory works began in 2007. After its completion, it will be the second underground service in Israel, after the Carmelit, in Haifa. Underground stations will be equipped with platform screen doors and also trains in the underground section will be operated in automatic train operation system.

Preparatory works
To date, NTA, the Government body responsible for the mass-transit development in the Tel Aviv region has spent several years performing utility relocation and right-of-way clearing for the railway. The bulk of the work however, including underground excavation, is to be carried out by the operator.

On April 10, 2008, works started on the conversion of part of the Jabotinsky Rd. in Petah Tikva into a sunken passage below Kaplan St.

As part of the preparatory works for the line, the main entrance to the Batei HaOsef museum in south Tel Aviv was cleared and relocated. The Bank HaPoalim branch on Herzl Street in the same area was also demolished.

TBM Shafts
In September 2011, work started on constructing 3 launching shafts for the TBMs
 Herzl Street shaft - located at the point where a cut and cover section ends and the tunneled section starts, used to launch TBMs in an easterly direction.
 Galei Gil car park shaft - located near the Ayalon Highway - used to launch TBMs in both easterly and westerly directions.
 Em HaMoshavot shaft - located near Highway 4 in Bnei Brak, used to launch TBMs in a westerly direction.

Tunnelling Works

In May 2015, the companies Solel Boneh and China Railway Tunnel Group won the 2.9 Billion NIS tender to build two  tunnels and 6 underground stations in the western section of the Tel Aviv light rail's red line.

In June 2015, the companies Danya Cebus and China Civil Engineering Construction Corporation (CCECC) won the 700 Million NIS tender to build underground Carlebach station of the Tel Aviv light rail's red line.

See also
 Tel Aviv Light Rail
 Jerusalem Light Rail

References

External links
 

Transport in Tel Aviv
Proposed railway lines in Israel
Tram and light rail transit systems under construction
2023 in rail transport
Tel Aviv Light Rail